Don't Censor Me is the second studio album by Audio Adrenaline, released on ForeFront Records on October 1, 1993. The album features the track "Big House", which is considered the band's most popular song.

Background and concept
According to the band, the album is aimed at a young audience like they were at the time. In an interview with CCM Magazine in 1996, they described the songs as "cheerleader songs" for their upbeat and cheerful rhythms. In the same interview, the band agrees that Don't Censor Me better approached the style and concept they wanted, when compared to their first album, but "it still didn't hit the mark".

Recording
Don't Censor Me was recorded in 1993 at various studios in Tennessee, Gaga Studios and Fun Attic, both in Franklin. Recording was in charge of Steve Griffith and Joe Baldridge. Griffith, Baldridge, and Dave Frank were also in charge of the mixing, some of which was done at SoundStage, in Nashville, Tennessee. The mastering was done by Hank Williams at MasterMix in Nashville.

Reception

Don't Censor Me was well received by the audience, selling more than 250,000 copies. Thom Granger, of AllMusic, gave the album 3 stars out of 5 calling it "more pop-savvy". Paul Portell, of Jesus Freak Hideout, gave the album 3.5 stars out of 5. Portell wrote that the album "showcases the band's rising maturity both lyrically and musically" and that it "may not be Audio Adrenaline's best effort, but at the same time a stepping stone in the band's growth spiritually and musically". Portell also compared their style to Collective Soul, Maroon 5, and John Mayer.

The album produced the hit singles "Can't Take God Away" and "Big House". The latter reached number 1 on Christian radio, and is often regarded one of the band's biggest hits of their career. It received the Song of the Decade title from CCM Magazine for the 1990s.

Music videos
Music videos were made for the songs "A.K.A. Public School", "Big House", and "We're a Band". dc Talk appeared as three "cool guys" in the video for "A.K.A. Public School".

Track listing

 Live recording later appeared on Live Bootleg (1995)

Personnel
Audio Adrenaline
 Mark Stuart – lead vocals
 Barry Blair – guitars
 Bob Herdman – keyboards
 Will McGinniss – bass

Additional musicians
Kevin Smith (of DC Talk) – cameo appearance on "My World View"
Dave Frank – vocals, musician
Steve Griffith – vocals, musician
Greg Herrington – musician
Tony Miracle — musician
Blair Masters — musician
Todd Collins — vocals, musician
Nicole Coleman-Mullen – vocals
Jimmie Lee Sloas – vocals, vocal arrangement on "Can't Take God Away"

Production
 Steve Griffith — producer, engineer, mixer
 The Gotee Brothers – producers for "Can't Take God Away" and "We're a Band"
 Eddie DeGarmo – executive producer
 Dan R. Brock — executive producer
 Dave Frank — mixer
 Joe Baldridge — engineer, mixer
 David Hall — assistant mix engineer
 Joan Miller — production assistant
 Hank Williams — mastering
 Jeff Frazier — photography
 Jeff and Lisa Franke — design
 Carol Maxwell — makeup

Don't Censor Me: Extended Play Remixes 
Don't Censor Me: Extended Play Remixes was released in 1994. The EP contains two remixes of "Can't Take God Away" and one each of "We're a Band" and "Big House". "Big House (Aquatic Dub Mix)" was remixed by Ian Eskelin; the remaining three tracks were remixed by Scott Blackwell.

References

1993 albums
Audio Adrenaline albums
ForeFront Records albums